Rachel Mann (born 1970) is a British Anglican priest, poet and feminist theologian. She is a trans woman who writes, speaks and broadcasts on a wide range of topics including gender, sexuality and religion.

Early life and education
Mann was born in 1970. She grew up in Worcestershire, in the village of Hartlebury, and attended Stourport-On-Severn High School. Between 1988 and 1991, she studied philosophy at Lancaster University and completed an M.A. at the same university from 1992 to 1993. She studied for a PhD in philosophy at Lancaster and was a teaching fellow from 1994 to 1996. From 2003 to 2005, she trained for ordained ministry at Queen's College, Birmingham, an ecumenical theological college. She holds an M.A. in creative writing from The Manchester Writing School and she undertook postgraduate studies in the Bible and 19th-century literature at Manchester Metropolitan University. Her doctoral thesis was titled "The representation of fecundity and barrenness in the poetry of Elizabeth Barrett Browning, Christina Rossetti, and the Bible: a critical and creative interrogation of a Christian-feminist poetics", and was completed in 2017.

Ordained ministry
Mann was ordained in the Church of England as a deacon in 2005 and as a priest in 2006. She served her curacy at St Matthew's Church, Stretford in the Diocese of Manchester. Between 2008 and 2017, she was Priest-in-Charge at the Church of St Nicholas, Burnage, before being appointed its Rector in 2018. Between 2009 and 2017, she was also Resident Poet at Manchester Cathedral. In 2017, she was made an honorary canon of Manchester Cathedral. Between February 2018 and the end of its extended quinquennium in July 2021, she was a member of the General Synod of the Church of England, having been elected by the clergy of the Diocese of Manchester.
In June 2021, she left St Nicholas Burnage to become full-time Area Dean of Bury and Rossendale. In the elections for the 2021-2026 Quinquennium, Mann was re-elected as a member of the Church of England's General Synod for Manchester.

Views
Mann belongs to the modern Catholic tradition of the Church of England, though she was brought up an Evangelical-Charismatic Christian. She supports the full inclusion of the LGBT people in the church. Since 2020, Mann is a patron of the Open Table Network, an ecumenical Christian community for LGBT people and their allies.

Author
She is the author of Dazzling Darkness: Gender, Sexuality, Illness & God (Glasgow: Wild Goose 2012) and The Risen Dust: Poems and Stories of Passion & Resurrection (Glasgow: Wild Goose 2013), both published by the publishing arm of the Iona Community. Mann is also a contributor to Fear and Friendship: Anglicans Engaging With Islam (Continuum 2012) and several books on liturgical theology, including Presiding Like a Woman (SPCK 2010). Her book about the First World War and Ritual, Fierce Imaginings: The Great War, Ritual, Memory & God (London: D.L.T. 2017) was shortlisted for the 2019 Michael Ramsey Prize for Theological Writing.

In 2018, she was appointed Visiting Teaching Fellow in Creative Writing and English at the Manchester Writing School, Manchester Metropolitan University. She is also a visiting scholar at Sarum College.

In 2019, Carcanet published her debut full poetry collection, A Kingdom of Love. The collection was Highly Commended in the 2020 Forward Prizes for Poetry.  In 2020, her debut novel, ‘’The Gospel of Eve’’, was published by D.L.T.

Mann is a regular contributor to The Church Times and contributes to BBC Radio 2's Pause For Thought and BBC Radio 4's Thought For The Day, The Daily Service and Prayer For The Day. She also writes about progressive music, metal and folk for Prog Magazine, an offshoot of Classic Rock Magazine, and The Quietus.

Selected works

References

External links
Personal website

1970 births
Living people
21st-century English Anglican priests
Transgender women
Transgender writers
LGBT Anglican clergy
21st-century English poets
English feminist writers
21st-century English theologians
English women poets
English Anglican theologians
Christian feminist theologians
Anglican poets
21st-century English women writers
English Anglo-Catholics
Anglo-Catholic clergy
Alumni of the Queen's Foundation
Alumni of Manchester Metropolitan University
Alumni of Lancaster University
Members of the General Synod of the Church of England